Halifax (known as the Halifax Blue Sox between 1996 and 2002) is an English rugby league club who have had numerous notable players (1,362 as of 31 October 2018) throughout their history, each player of the rugby league era who has played (and so excludes non-playing substitutes) in a competitive first-class match (including those matches that were subsequently abandoned, expunged or re-played, but excluding friendlies) has been allocated a sequential heritage number in order of their appearance by Halifax.

List of players
 
 
 ^¹ = Played For Halifax During More Than One Period
 ^² = Prior to the 1974–75 season all goals, whether; conversions, penalties, or drop-goals, scored two points, consequently prior to this date drop-goals were often not explicitly documented, and "0²" indicates that drop-goals may not have been recorded, rather than no drop-goals scored. In addition, prior to the 1949–50 season, the Field-goal was also still a valid means of scoring points.
 ^³ = During the first two seasons of the Northern Union (now known as the Rugby Football League), i.e. the 1895–96 season and 1896–97 season, conversions were worth 2-points, penalty goals 3-points and drop goals 4-points
 ¢ = player has (potential) links to other rugby league clubs on Wikipedia
 BBC = BBC2 Floodlit Trophy
 CC = Challenge Cup
 CF = Championship Final
 CM = Captain Morgan Trophy
 RT = League Cup, i.e. Player's № 6, John Player (Special), Regal Trophy
 YC = Yorkshire County Cup
 YL = Yorkshire League

Players earning international caps while at Halifax

 Alvin Ackerley won caps for England while at Halifax 1952 Other Nationalities (2 matches), Wales, 1953 France (2 matches), Wales, and won caps for Great Britain while at Halifax 1952 Australia, 1958 New Zealand
 Albert Akroyd won caps for England while at Halifax 1921 Wales
 Asa Amone won caps for Tonga while at Halifax 1995 ?-caps
 Albert Atkinson won caps for England while at Halifax 1930 Other Nationalities
 Simon Baldwin won caps for England while at Halifax 1995 Wales (sub), France
 Ike Bartle won caps for England while at Halifax 1906 Other Nationalities
 Arthur Bassett won caps for Wales while at Halifax 1939...1946 3-caps, and won caps for Great Britain while at Halifax in 1946 against Australia (2 matches)
 David Bates won caps for Ireland while at Gateshead Thunder, Halifax and York City Knights 2003...2006 3-caps + 3-caps (sub)
 Jack Beames won a cap for Other Nationalities while at Halifax, won caps for Wales while at Halifax 1914...1921 2-caps, and won caps for Great Britain while at Halifax in 1921 against Australia (2 matches)
 Nat Bentham won caps for England while at Wigan Highfield 1928 Wales (2 matches), while at Halifax: 1929 Other Nationalities, while at Warrington 1930 Other Nationalities(2 matches), and won caps for Great Britain while at Wigan Highfield 1928 Australia (3 matches), New Zealand (3 matches), while at Halifax: 1929–30 Australia (2 matches), while at Warrington: Australia (2 matches)
 John Bentley won caps for England while at Halifax 1995 France, Australia, Fiji, South Africa, 1996 Wales, and won caps for Great Britain while at Leeds 1992 France, Halifax 1994 France
 Dai Royston Bevan won caps for Great Britain while at Halifax ?-caps
 Harry Beverley won caps for England while at Hunslet 1935 Wales, 1936 France, 1937 France, 1938 Wales, France, and won caps for Great Britain while at Hunslet 1936 Australia (3 matches), 1937 Australia, Halifax 1937 Australia (2 matches)
 Anthony Blackwood won caps for Wales while at Halifax, and Celtic Crusaders 2005...present 7(6?)-caps 3-tries 12-points
 Billy Bulmer won caps for England while at Halifax 1904 Other Nationalities
 Oliver Burgham won caps for Wales while at Ebbw Vale in 1908 against New Zealand, and England, and won a cap for Great Britain while at Halifax in 1911 against Australia
 Phil Cantillon won caps for and captained  ‘’Ireland’’ while at Halifax 2003-2006 
 Gavin Clinch won caps for Ireland while at Huddersfield-Sheffield Giants, and Halifax 2000...2001 1-cap + 1-cap (sub)
 Mike Condon won caps for Wales while at Halifax 1952...1953 3-caps
 Terry Cook won caps for Wales while at Halifax 1951...1953 4-caps
 Arthur Daniels won caps for Wales while at Halifax 1949...1953 13-caps, and won caps for Great Britain while at Halifax 1952...1955 3-caps
 Ivor Davies? won caps for Wales while at Halifax, and represented Great Britain (tour-matches) while at Halifax
 Will Davies, Will T. Davies won caps for Wales while at Batley and Halifax 1909...1912 4-caps, and won a cap for Great Britain while at Halifax in 1911 against Australia
 Ken Dean won caps for England while at Halifax 1951 Other Nationalities, 1952 Other Nationalities
 Colin Dixon won caps for Wales while at Halifax, Salford and Hull Kingston Rovers 1963...1981 (11?) 16-caps, and won caps for Great Britain while at Halifax, Salford and Hull Kingston Rovers 1968...1981 14-caps

 Percy Eccles won caps for England while at Halifax 1908 New Zealand, and won caps for Great Britain while at Halifax 1908 New Zealand
 Arthur 'Candy' Evans won caps for Wales while at Halifax, Leeds, Castleford, and Warrington 1928...1933 4-caps
 Fred Firth, won caps for England (RU) while at Halifax in 1894 against Wales, Ireland, and Scotland
 Ben Fisher won caps for Scotland while at Halifax, and Hull Kingston Rovers 2005...present 6-caps + 1-cap (sub)
 Terry Fogerty represented Commonwealth XIII while at Halifax in 1965 against New Zealand at Crystal Palace National Recreation Centre, London on Wednesday 18 August 1965, and won caps for Great Britain while at Halifax in 1966 against New Zealand, while at Wigan in 1967 against France, and while at Rochdale in 1974 against France
 Damian Gibson won caps for Wales while at Halifax, Salford, and Castleford (1996?)1999...present 16(15, 18?)-caps + 2-caps (sub) 8-tries 32-points
 Tony Halmshaw won a cap for Great Britain while at Halifax in 1971 against New Zealand
 Karl Harrison won caps for England while at Halifax 1995 Wales, Australia (2 matches), South Africa, Wales, 1996 France, and won caps for Great Britain while at Hull F.C. 1990 Australia (3 matches), while at Halifax 1991 Papua New Guinea, 1992 Australia (sub) (2 matches), New Zealand, New Zealand (sub), 1993 France, New Zealand (2 matches), 1994 Australia (3 matches)
 James "Jimmy" Hilton won caps for England while at Halifax 1908 Wales, 1912 Wales
 Hudson Irving won caps for England while at Halifax 1938 Wales, 1940 Wales, 1941 Wales, 1943 Wales
 Michael Jackson won caps for Great Britain while at Wakefield Trinity 1991 Papua New Guinea, 1992 France, Australia (sub), New Zealand (sub), while at Halifax 1993 New Zealand (sub) (2 matches)
 Walter Jesse Jackson, won caps for England (RU) while at Halifax in 1894 against Scotland
 Neil James won a cap for Great Britain while at Halifax in 1986 against France
 David Jones won caps for Wales while at Halifax 1968...1969 2-caps
 Phil Joseph won caps for Wales while at Hull Kingston Rovers and Halifax 2005...2007 7(6?)-caps 1-try 4-points
 Martin Ketteridge won caps for Scotland while at Halifax 1996 3-caps + 1-cap (sub)
 Stanley "Stan" Kielty won caps for England while at Halifax 1953 Wales, France, Other Nationalities
 George Langhorn won caps for England while at Halifax 1905 Other Nationalities
 Jason Lee won caps for Wales while at Warrington, Keighley and Halifax 1994...2001 5-caps + 2-caps (sub) 2-tries 8-points
 William "Billy" B. Little won caps for England while at Halifax 1904 Other Nationalities
 "Bobby"/"Robbie" Lloyd won 7-caps for Wales (RU) while at Pontypool RFC, won a cap for Wales (RL) while at Halifax in 1921, and won a cap for Great Britain (RL) while at Halifax in 1920 against Australia
 Tommy Lynch won caps for Other Nationalities while at Halifax (4-caps).

 Melvyn "Mel" Meek won caps for Wales while at Halifax 1935...1949 14-caps
 Alf Milnes won caps for Great Britain while at Halifax in 1920 against Australia (2 matches)
 Paul Moriarty won caps for Wales while at Widnes, Halifax, South Wales, and unattached 1991...2000 15(14?)-caps + 1-cap (sub)
 Chris Morley won caps for Wales while at St. Helens in 1996 against France (sub), and England, while at Salford in 1999 against Ireland and Scotland, while at Sheffield Eagles in 2000 against South Africa (sub), while at Leigh in the 2000 Rugby League World Cup against Lebanon (sub), New Zealand, Papua New Guinea (sub), and Australia, while at Oldham in 2001 against England, while at Halifax in 2003 against Russia, and Australia, while at Swinton in 2006 against Scotland, 1996...2006 13(14?)-caps + 4-caps (sub) 1(2?)-try 4(8?)-points
 Johnny Morley won caps for England while at Halifax 1904 Other Nationalities
 Walter Morton won caps for England while at Halifax 1905 Other Nationalities
 Andrew Murdison won cap(s) for Other Nationalities while at Halifax
 Garfield Owen a won cap for Wales while at Halifax 1959 1-cap
 Sean Penkywicz won caps for Wales while at Halifax 2007...present 1-cap + 3-caps (sub) 1-try 4-points
 Mark Perrett won caps for Wales while at Halifax 1994...1996(1995?) 9(7?)-caps
 Daio Powell won caps for Wales while at Halifax?/Bradford Northern? 1994(...1998?) 1(4?)-caps + 2-caps (sub) 2-tries 8-points
 Stuart Prosser won a cap for Great Britain while at Halifax in 1914 against Australia
 Dai Rees won a cap for Other Nationalities while at Halifax, won caps for Wales while at Halifax 1921...32 6-caps, and won a cap for Great Britain while at Halifax in 1926 against New Zealand
 Charlie Renilson won caps for Great Britain while at Halifax 1965 New Zealand, 1967 Australia (sub), 1968 France (2 matches), Australia, France, New Zealand, France (World Cup 1968 3-caps)
 Jack Riley won caps for England while at Halifax 1904 Other Nationalities
 Joe Riley won caps for England while at Halifax 1910 Wales, 1911 Australia, and won caps for Great Britain while at Halifax 1910 Australia
 Ken Roberts won caps for Great Britain whilst at Halifax 1963 Australia, 1964 against France (2 matches), in 1965 against France, and New Zealand (3 matches), and in 1966 against France, and New Zealand (2 matches)
 Mark Roberts won a cap for Wales while at Halifax 2007 1-cap
 Asa Robinson won caps for England while at Halifax 1908 Wales (2 matches), New Zealand, 1909 Australia (3 matches), and won caps for Great Britain while at Halifax 1908 New Zealand, 1908–09 Australia (2 matches)
 Paul Rowley won caps for England while at Halifax 1996 France (sub), 2000 Australia, Russia, Ireland

 Derrick Schofield won caps for England while at Rochdale Hornets 1952 Wales, 1953 France, and won caps for Great Britain while at Halifax 1955 New Zealand
 John Schuster won caps for Western Samoa while at Halifax 1995 ?-caps
 S. John "Joby" Shaw won caps for Great Britain while at Halifax 1960 France, Australia, France, 1961 France, 1962 New Zealand (World Cup 1960 2-caps)
 Matthew Silva won a cap for Wales while at Halifax 1991 1-cap
 George Slicker won a cap for Ireland while at Halifax 1995 1-cap + 1-cap (sub)
 Herbert Smith won caps for England while at Halifax 1927 Wales, and won caps for Great Britain while at Bradford 1926–27 New Zealand (2 matches)
 Cyril Stacey won a cap for Great Britain while at Halifax in 1920 against New Zealand
 Dai Thomas won caps for Wales while at Halifax 1908, against England in 1908 3-caps
 George Thomson, won caps for England (RU) while at Halifax in 1878 against Scotland, in 1882 against Ireland, Scotland and Wales, in 1883 against Ireland, and Scotland, in 1884 against Ireland and Scotland, and in 1885 against Ireland
 John Thorley won caps for Other Nationalities while at Halifax circa-1952...60 2-caps, won caps for Wales while at Halifax 1953...1959 (2?)3-caps, and won caps for Great Britain while at Halifax in the 1954 Rugby League World Cup against Australia, France, New Zealand, and France, and also represented Great Britain while at Halifax between 1952 and 1956 against France (1 non-Test match)
 Frank Todd won caps for England while at Halifax 1921 Australia, 1923 Wales, 1924 Other Nationalities
 Ernest Ward won caps for England while at Halifax 1909 Australia
 Les White won caps for England while at York 1946 France (2 matches), Wales (2 matches), 1947 France (2 matches), Wales, while at Wigan 1947 Wales, 1948 France, while at Halifax 1951 Wales, and won caps for Great Britain while at York 1946 Australia (3 matches), New Zealand, while at Wigan 1947 New Zealand (2 matches)
 Jack Wilkinson won caps for England while at Halifax 1953 Other Nationalities, 1955 Other Nationalities, and won caps for Great Britain while at Halifax 1954 Australia, New Zealand (2 matches), 1955 New Zealand (3 matches), Wakefield Trinity 1959 Australia, 1960 France (2 matches), New Zealand, France, Australia, 1962 New Zealand (World Cup 1960 3-caps, 1-try)
 Harry Wilkinson, won a cap for England (RU) while at Halifax in 1889 against New Zealand Natives
 Frank Williams won a cap for Wales while at Halifax in 1914, and won caps for Great Britain while at Halifax in 1914 against Australia (2 matches)
 William Williams won caps for Wales while at Halifax 1908...10 4-caps
 David Willicombe won caps for Wales while at Halifax in 1970 against England, while at Wigan in 1975 against France, and England, in the 1975 Rugby League World Cup against France, England, Australia, New Zealand, New Zealand and France, and in 1978 against France, England and Australia, and won caps for Great Britain while at Wigan in 1974 against France (2 matches), and New Zealand
 Albert Wood, won a cap for England (RU) while at Halifax in 1884 against Ireland

Halifax RLFC Hall of Fame 

 George Thomson Forward 1875–85
 Jimmy Dodd Centre 1876–93
 Archie Rigg Half-Back 1891–1915
 George Langhorn Forward 1897–1913;
 Joe Riley Centre 1901–15
 Billy Little Full-Back 1901–10
 Asa Robinson Forward 1904–23
 Jack Beames Forward 1913–22
 Cyril Stacey Three-Quarter 1915–29
 Frank Todd Stand-Off 1916–28
 Dai Rees Forward 1921–32
 Hudson Irving Forward 1933–47
 Hubert Lockwood Full-Back 1934–46 Rugby League XIII 1942
 Charles Smith Centre 1936–48
 Harry Beverley Loose Forward 1937–41
 Arthur Bassett Winger 1939–48
 Arthur Daniels Winger 1945–57
 Stan Kielty Scrum-Half 1946–58 (Testimonial match 1955)
 Ken Dean Stand-Off 1948–60 (Testimonial match 1958)
 Jack Wilkinson Prop 1948–59 (Testimonial match 1958)
 Alvin Ackerley Hooker 1948–58
 Albert Fearnley Second Row 1950–56
 Tommy Lynch Centre 1951–56 (Testimonial match 1956)
 John Thorley Prop 1952–60
 John Burnett Centre 1953–67
 Johnny Freeman Winger 1954–67 (Testimonial match 1967)
 Alan Kellett Scrum-Half 1954
 Garfield Owen Full-Back 1956–61
 Charlie Renilson Loose Forward 1957–69 (Testimonial match 1968)
 Jack Scroby Prop 1959–70 (Testimonial match 1969)
 Terry Fogerty Second Row 1961–73
 Ronnie James Full-Back 1961–72 (Testimonial match 1971)
 Colin Dixon Centre 1961–68
 Ken Roberts Prop 1963–67
 Gordon Baker Scrum-Half 1964–82 (Testimonial match 1975)
 Mick Scott Second Row 1974–91 (1987 Challenge Cup Winner)
 Chris Anderson Stand-Off 1984–87
 John A Martin Second-Row 1967–1980 (Testimonial match 1978)

Other notable players
These players have either; played in a Challenge Cup, Rugby Football League Championship, Yorkshire County Cup, or Yorkshire League Final, played during Super League (Super League I (1996)) -to- Super League VIII (2003), have received a Testimonial match, were international representatives before, or after, their time at Halifax, or are notable outside of rugby league.

 Makali Aizue
 F. T. "Hefty" Adams
 Paul Anderson
 Stuart Arundel
 Albert Atkinson
 Damian Ball
 Stephen Bannister
 Benjamin "Ben" Beevers
 Martin Bella
 Bob Beswick
 Jamie Bloem
 Fred Bone
 Joseph Bonnar
 David Bouveng
 Gwilym Bowen
 Dominic Brambani
 Luke Branighan
 Paul Broadbent
 Andrew Brocklehurst
 Mike Brown
 Peter Brown
 David "Dave" Busfield
 David "Dave" Callon
 Phil Cantillon
 Chris Chester
 Des Clarkson
 Ryan Clayton
 Colin Clifft
 John Clough
 Jack P. Clowes
 Isaac Cole
 Ged Corcoran
 Shirley Crabtree, Sr
 Phil Cantillon
 John Dalgreen
 Trevor Denton
 Paul Dixon
 Dane Dorahy
 John Dorahy
 Hugh Duffy
 Andrew Dunemann
 Graham Eadie
 Rod Eastwood
 Abi Ekoku
 Mark Elia
 St. John Ellis
 Anthony Farrell
 Liam Finn
 Lee Finnerty
 Mark Flanagan
 Jason Flowers
 Adam Fogerty
 Norman Foster
 Frank Fox
 Andrew Frew
 Jim Gannon
 Stanley Gene
 Wilfred "Wilf" George
 Damian Gibson
 Mark Gleeson
 Marvin Golden
 Lee Greenwood
 Tommy Grey
 Oswald Griffiths
 Tyssul Griffiths
 Scott Grix
 Simon Grix
 Michael Hagan
 James Haley
 Martin Hall
 Graeme Hallas
 Danny Halliwell
 Colum Halpenny
 Karle Hammond
 Paul Harkin
 Neil Harmon
 Phil Hassan
 Roy Hawksley
 John Henderson
 Aaron Heremaia
 Alfred Higgs
 Paul Highton
 Joe Hirst
 David Hodgson
 Stephen Holgate
 Les Holliday
 Graham Holroyd
 Adam Hughes
 Duncan Jackson
 Francis Jarvis
 Danny Jones
 Brian Juliff
 Alan Kellett
 Andrew Kirk
 Simon Knox
 Craig Kopczak
 Dave Larder
 Dean Lawford
 Alan Marchant
 Richard Marshall
 William "Billy" Mather
 Seamus McCallion
 Ryan McDonald
 Shayne McMenemy
 Dominic Maloney
 Christopher Maye
 Gary Mercer
 Jim Mills
 Lee Milner
 Martin Moana
 Kevin Moore
 Gilbert Morgan
 Damian Munro
 Keith Neller
 George Nēpia
 Tawera Nikau
 Harold Palin
 Leslie "Les" Pearce
 Martin Pearson
 John Pendlebury
 Joel Penny
 Wyn Phillips
 Billy Pratt
 Michael Ratu
 Paddy Reid
 Rob Roberts
 Barry Robinson
 Geoff Robinson
 Paul Round
 Shad Royston
 Fred Rule
 Derek Schofield
 Mick Scott
 Anthony Seuseu
 Rikki Sheriffe
 Andy Smith
 Richard Smith
 Steve Smith
 Roy Southernwood
 Brian Sparks
 Andy Speak
 Marcus St Hilaire
 Dan Stains
 Gary Stephens
 Said Tamghart
 Jamie Thackray
 Danny Tickle
 Fred Tottey
 Ken Traill
 Aaron Trinder
 Freddie Tuilagi
 Mike Umaga
 Frank Watene
 Dave Watson
 Paul White
 Colin Whitfield
 Lionel Williamson
 Scott Wilson
 Rob Worrincy
 David Wrench

References

 
Halifax RLFC